The Devil Dancer is a 1927 American silent romantic drama film directed by Fred Niblo and produced by Samuel Goldwyn.

For his work on this film, The Magic Flame and Sadie Thompson, cinematographer George Barnes was nominated for the first Academy Award for Best Cinematography at the 1st Academy Awards ceremony in 1929.

The Devil Dancer is now considered a lost film.

Cast
 Gilda Gray as Takla (The Devil Dancer)
 Clive Brook as Stephen Athelstan
 Anna May Wong as Sada
 Serge Temoff as Beppo
 Michael Vavitch as Hassim
 Sōjin Kamiyama as Sadik Lama 
 Anne Schaefer as Tana 
 Albert Conti as Arnold Guthrie
 Martha Mattox as Isabel
 Kalla Pasha as Toy
James B. Leong as The Grand Lama
 William H. Tooker as Lathrop
 Claire Du Brey as Audrey
 Nora Cecil as Julia
Barbara Tennant as The White Woman
 Herbert Evans (uncredited minor part)
 Jack Harvey (uncredited minor part)
 Ura Mita (uncredited minor part)
 Clarissa Selwynne (uncredited minor part)

References

External links

Lobby card
Still at fineartamerica.com

1927 romantic drama films
1927 films
American romantic drama films
American silent feature films
American black-and-white films
Lost American films
Samuel Goldwyn Productions films
Films directed by Fred Niblo
1927 lost films
Lost romantic drama films
1920s American films
Silent romantic drama films
Silent American drama films